Westman may refer to:

 Westman Region, Manitoba, Canada
 Westman Islands, an archipelago off the south coast of Iceland
 Celts in Ireland were called Westmen in Old Norse

People with the surname
Alf Westman (1921–1998), Swedish hurdler, 1948 Summer Olympian
Axel Westman (1894-1960), Swedish physician and university professor 
Benjamin Westman (born 1976), American-Swedish football manager
Carl Westman (1866–1936), Swedish architect and interior designer
Cody Westman (born 1978), Canadian filmmaker/musician
Edvard Westman (1865–1917), Swedish painter
Elisabeth Westman (born 1966), Swedish road cyclist
Emil Westman (1894-1935), Swedish-Danish artist
Erika Westman (born 1971), Swedish curler
Frida Westman (born 2001), Swedish ski jumper
Gunnar Westman (1915-1985), Danish sculptor 
Gucci Westman (born 1971), American makeup artist, cosmetic designer
Hans Westman (1905–1991), Swedish architect
Henrik Westman (1940–2019), Swedish politician
James Westman (born 1972), Canadian baritone singer
Johanna Westman (born 1969), Swedish children's book author and television host
Jonas Westman (1909–1983), Swedish skier, 1936 Winter Olympian
Karl Gustaf Westman (1876–1944), Swedish politician
Karl Ivan Westman (1889–1970), Swedish diplomat
Lars Westman (writer) (born 1934), Swedish journalist
Lars Westman (born 1938), Swedish film maker and cartoonist
Magnus Westman (born 1966), Swedish ski jumper, 1992 and 1992 Winter Olympian
Nydia Westman (1902–1970), American actress and singer
Richard A. Westman (born 1959), American politician
Roger Westman (1939-2020), English architect
Rolf Westman (1927-2017), Finnish professor 
Tom Westman (born 1964), American reality TV personality
Torsten Westman (1920-2012), Swedish architect